The Czechoslovakia men's national under-21 volleyball team represented Czechoslovakia in international men's volleyball competitions and friendly matches under the age 21. It was ruled by the Czechoslovak Volleyball Federation, that was an affiliate member of the Federation of International Volleyball (FIVB) and was a part of the European Volleyball Confederation (CEV).

Results

FIVB U21 World Championship
 Champions   Runners-up   3rd place   4th place

Europe U21 / 20 Championship
 Champions   Runners-up   3rd place   4th place

Team

Past Squads

References

External links

Official website
FIVB profile

National men's under-21 volleyball teams
Volleyball in Czechoslovakia